Bartram Springs is a master-planned residential community located in Jacksonville, Florida. It resides on the Duval County and St. Johns County line.

Geography

Bartram Springs is located at the very bottom of Duval County. Interstate 95 borders it on the west side, US 1 borders it on the east side, and Racetrack Road borders it on the south side. The only entrance is on Racetrack Road. Residents actually drive out of Duval County to enter and leave the development, as the first  of Bartram Parkway is located in St. Johns County.

The Bartram Springs development is a part of the Bartram Park DRI (development of regional impact).

Community design

Original plans called for 1,400 single-family homes, and 294 units in the Villages of Bartram Springs.

Bartram Springs has a junior sized pool and a children's pool with a waterslide. Homeowners also enjoy tennis courts, a racquetball court, soccer fields, and multiple playgrounds.

Government
The development is guided by a CDD (community development district) and an HOA (home owners association). The CDD has authority over the common areas and community property in the development. The HOA enforces the local covenants and restrictions that all homeowners in the development are bound to uphold.

Construction periods
The single-family units of Bartram Springs were built in six main phases of construction. As of Summer 2009, Bartram Springs is considered built-out, and all of the model homes have been sold.
 Phase 1A, 225 dwellings
 Phase 1B, 196 dwellings
 Phase 2, 78 dwellings
 Phase 3A, 334 dwellings
 Phase 3B, 174 dwellings
 Phase 4, 187 dwellings

Based on public tax records, aerial views and the Plat Books filed with the City of Jacksonville, there are actually 1,381 single-family homes in Bartram Springs.

Lot sizes
Lots in Bartram Springs are classified based on their frontage. Many of the corner lots have an irregular shape.

Streets in Bartram Springs
Bartram Springs features 48 individual street names, including the main entrance road. In Phase 1A, 1B and Phase 2, several streets were broken up and given directional suffixes, such as Silver Glen Drive completed in Phase 1A, and Silver Glen Drive East in Phase 1B. Starting with Phase 3A, no more streets were handled this way. Even streets that form a complete loop, such as Bulow Creek Drive, maintain a single name for the whole street.

The speed limit is not posted on the remaining streets, however the speed limit is 25 miles per hour. Sidewalks and street lights are present on both sides of the streets.

There is a dedicated bike lane on both sides of Bartram Springs Parkway and both the inner and outer loops of Cherry Lake Drive.

Streets in the Villages of Bartram Springs
There are two additional streets in the Villages of Bartram Springs. The entrance to the Villages is located about four tenths of a mile from Racetrack Road, on the western side of Bartram Parkway.

The main street is called Bartram Village Drive, and the second street is called Bartram Village Lane.

Schools

Elementary
As of fall 2009, all children living in Bartram Springs will attend a new elementary school that is being built inside the development. Ground was broken on August 13 of 2008. The school is located on the East side of the main entrance, about four tenths of a mile in from Racetrack Road. The new School is sized to hold about 800 Kindergarten through 5th grade students. It is named Bartram Springs Elementary, and it will open for its first official day of school on August 24, 2009. The school received an A+ rating for the 2009 school year.

Middle school
As of fall 2009, students in the 6th through 8th Grades go to Twin Lakes Academy Middle School.

High school
As of fall 2010, students in the 9th through the 12th Grades go to Atlantic Coast High School.

Schools
 Bartram Springs Elementary
 Twin Lakes Academy Middle
 Atlantic Coast High

See also

 Neighborhoods of Jacksonville

References

External links
 Official Bartram Springs website
 Bartram Springs HOA website
 Bartram Springs Community Forum website

External links
 

Populated places in Duval County, Florida
Neighborhoods in Jacksonville, Florida
Unincorporated communities in St. Johns County, Florida
Unincorporated communities in Florida